Surak (also romanized as Sūrak) is a city & capital of Miandorud County, Mazandaran Province, Iran.  At the 2006 census, its population was 8,817, in 2,377 families.

Agricultural products
Agricultural products include rice, citrus and tobacco.

References

Cities in Mazandaran Province
Populated places in Miandorud County
Settled areas of Elburz